The 2002 college football season may refer to:

 2002 NCAA Division I-A football season
 2002 NCAA Division I-AA football season
 2002 NCAA Division II football season
 2002 NCAA Division III football season
 2002 NAIA Football National Championship